Mauriceville is a rural locality in the Masterton district, part of the Wairarapa region of New Zealand's North Island. The area is about half-way between Masterton and Eketahuna, and is today split between Mauriceville East (on the Ōpaki-Kaiparoro Road) and Mauriceville West (nearer to Mount Bruce).

History 
Mauriceville was named after Maurice O'Rorke, a contemporary New Zealand politician who was Minister of Immigration and Crown Lands when the village was first founded, and was actually present when the site for the township was chosen.

The area was first settled in 1872, as the Scandinavian workers brought in to clear the Seventy-Mile Bush began to move north from Kōpuaranga, these workers were mostly mixed Danish, Norwegian and Swedish families, and were seen as Model Colonists. By 1897, the area's main industries were dairy farming and lime burning, and there were two schools, a railway station, two post/telegraph office, a Lutheran Church, several clubs and a public hall.

The distinctly Scandinavian character of the settlement can be seen through the names of the early inhabitants. The surnames present in the 1875 Wise's Directory entries for Mauriceville (then split into North, South and West) are Halburg, Hansen, Jorgensen, Larsen, Peterson, Thomsen, Ammundsen, Andersen, Anlin, Bosen, Christiansen, Ericsen, Jespersen, Jespersen, Larsen, Larsen, Neilsen, Olsen, Swenson, Allburg, Brodersen, Christensen, Christensen, Christian, Cullen, Dorset, Forgensen, Gundersen, Hansen, Jacobsen, Jensen, Larsen, Larsen, Larsen, Neilsen, Neilsen, Neilsen, Pedersen, Dobblestein, Jensen, Jensen, Jensen, Johannesen, Lauristen, Mortensen, Olsten, Pedersen, Pedersen and Roigaard, only a few of which are not of Scandinavian origin.

Like other Scandinavian townships of the Seventy-Mile Bush, such as Dannevirke, Norsewood, Eketahuna and Kōpuaranga, this population soon diversified, and the Scandinavian settlers quickly assimilated into the Anglo-Saxon population, marrying the English and Scots settlers and fighting by their side in the World Wars. They were even considered by some to be more assimilated than New Zealanders of Southern Irish descent.

Education

See also 

 Mauriceville railway station

References 

Masterton District
Populated places in the Wellington Region